Mixolineidae is a family of worms belonging to the order Heteronemertea.

Genera:
 Aetheorhynchus Gibson, 1981
 Mixolineus Müller & Scripcariu, 1971

References

Heteronemertea
Nemertea families